Margaret O'Leary-Leacy born in Wexford is a former camogie player selected on the camogie team of the century in 2004, and winner of All Ireland medals in 1968, 1969 and 1975.

Playing career
She played for Buffers Alley Club with whom she won three All Ireland Club Championships. She also holds eight Gael Linn interprovincial medals. She was selected as the Gaelic Weekly All Star Camogie Player of the Year in 1968 and was twice voted Wexford Powers "Sport Star of the Year" 1966 and 1968.

Administrator
She later became Chair of the Oulart the Ballagh club where she trained five Féile na Gael teams to All Ireland success.

Citation
Her team of the century citation read "a player of remarkable all round ability, she was equally at home at midfield or in the backs. A powerful striker, she was capable of turning defence into attack with one puck of the sliotar. Highly motivated, determined and full of energy she inspired her team-mates."

GAA Family
Her daughters Mary and Una later played for Wexford.

She was inducted into the Gaelic Writers’ Association Hall of Fame in 2022.

References

Cork camogie players
Year of birth missing (living people)
Living people